Cholius luteolaris is a species of moth in the family Crambidae. It is found in France, Spain, Italy, Slovenia, Austria, the Czech Republic, Slovakia, Hungary, Croatia, Bosnia and Herzegovina, Romania, Bulgaria, the Republic of Macedonia, Greece, Turkey and Lebanon.

Adults have uniform ochreous coloured forewings.

Subspecies
Cholius luteolaris luteolaris
Cholius luteolaris albescentalis (Hampson, 1900) (Turkey)

References

Moths described in 1772
Scopariinae
Moths of Europe
Taxa named by Giovanni Antonio Scopoli